Paradiso Festival was an annual electronic dance music (EDM) festival held at The Gorge Amphitheatre located on the Columbia River in George, Washington, United States. Founded by USC Events and Live Nation Entertainment in 2012, Paradiso was billed as the "largest Electronic Dance Music event ever staged in the Pacific Northwest", with the 2012 attendance exceeding 29,000 people. The 2013 event saw performances by Kaskade, Porter Robinson, Tiesto, and more.

On January 28, 2020 Insomniac filed a lawsuit against USC Events alleging that USC refused to account for $2 million meant for artists and vendors at the 2019 festival. Insomniac has expressed interest in having a summer event at the Gorge which will likely replace Paradiso.

Camping 
Attendants of the Paradiso Festival also had an option to camp at The Gorge Amphitheatre. While the festival itself was two days long, camping traditionally began a day before the festival started. At the 2017 festival, camping was open to everyone at 1 p.m. PST. There were four types of camping an attendant could buy: Standard Camping, Premier Camping, Gold Camping, and Terrace Camping. The Standard Camping pass was the cheapest option, while the Terrace Camping pass was the most expensive. Each camp ground had its own perks, with the perks getting better as one purchased a more expensive camping pass. Campers were normally permitted one vehicle and six people per camp site. There were vendors for food and misc. items such as clothing and artist merchandise, as well as showers towards the middle of the camp grounds. There were Porta Potty/Handwashing stations, and trash cans located throughout the campgrounds.

Culture 
Attendants could expect to see costumes and outfits that are catered to the EDM industry, such as vibrantly colored clothing. Many attendants were also representative of the PLUR movement. Art was also a centerpiece at the festival, with festivalgoers finding many different artistic displays throughout the festival grounds. Many of the performances represented EDM, but within the genre itself there was a wide spectrum of sounds that were then categorized into various subgenres. Some examples commonly found were house music and trap music.

The Festival 
Attendants could expect to be searched and patted down upon entry to the festival for illegal substances and alcohol. In the actual festival area, attendants could find vendors for food and drinks. Other vendors sold accessories, clothing, and assorted miscellaneous items. There were carnival rides and carnival games for those who were interested. Hydration stations and Porta Potties were set up almost everywhere within the area. There were also people who walked around looking out for those who need help, called the "Conscious Crew". There were medical tents for those in need. There were three total stages, with three artists playing simultaneously, with attendants often going back and forth between artists until their sets were over. At night, the main stage was typically where major artists would play. Several headliners from the 2017 festival included Yellow Claw and Marshmello. Attendants could expect to see light shows and lasers at the various stages throughout the night.

Line-Ups

See also
List of electronic music festivals

References

External links

Music festivals established in 2012
Music festivals in Washington (state)
Electronic music festivals in the United States